Cuando ella saltó is a 2007 Argentine drama film directed and written by Sabrina Farji. The film stars Iván de Pineda and Andrea Galante and deals with the theme of suicide.

Iván de Pineda received the 2008 Best New Actor Silver Condor award for his performance as Ramiro.

Cast
Iván de Pineda as Ramiro
Andrea Galante as Lila / Ángela
Juan M. Aguiar as Neighbour
Boy Olmi as El Zafiro
Lalo Mir as El Licenciado
Victoria Carreras as Diana Triada
Sandra Ballesteros as Ana
Leonardo Ramírez as  Seferino
Darío Levy as Uno
Diego Cosin as Dos
Antonia De Michelis  as nurse
Zoe Trilnick Farji as Niña Gitana

References

External links
 
 Cuando ella saltó at the cinenacional.com 

2007 films
Argentine drama films
2000s Spanish-language films
2000s Argentine films